Harvey R. Cohen (September 13, 1951, Brookline, Massachusetts – January 14, 2007, Agoura Hills, California) was an American composer and orchestrator.

Career

Growing up in Boston, Cohen studied music at the University of Hartford and at the graduate level at Brooklyn College in New York City. He later studied with film composer Earle Hagen.

He received two Emmy Awards for Outstanding Music Direction and Composition in the animated television shows, The Adventures of Batman & Robin, episode "A Bullet for Bullock", and Disney's TV series Aladdin.

Cohen provided orchestration for numerous films, including South Park: Bigger, Longer & Uncut, Down With Love, The Patriot, Doug's 1st Movie, Naked Gun : The Final Insult, Sabrina, and All Dogs Go to Heaven. He also provided original music scores for Ghost Town (1988) and Santa vs. the Snowman 3D (2002). Television shows for which he wrote music include Sex and the City, The Wonder Years, and The New Batman Adventures. He also arranged music for such recording artists as Kenny G and The Irish Tenors.

Death

Cohen died from a massive heart attack in January 2007, at the age of 55.

External links

Obituary at the San Diego Union-Tribune

1951 births
2007 deaths
People from Brookline, Massachusetts
American male composers
University of Hartford alumni
Brooklyn College alumni
20th-century American composers
20th-century American male musicians
Burials at Eden Memorial Park Cemetery